Ogreeta is an unincorporated community in Cherokee County, in the U.S. state of North Carolina.

History
Variant names are "Ogreta" and "Ogretta".  A post office called Ogreeta was established in 1880, and remained in operation until 1927. "Ogreeta" most likely is a name derived from an unidentified Native American language; the meaning is unknown.

References

Unincorporated communities in North Carolina
Unincorporated communities in Cherokee County, North Carolina